Cathy Rosier (January 2, 1945 in Fort-de-France – May 17, 2004) was a model and actress born in Martinique, French West Indies. She died in Marrakech, Morocco from a ruptured aorta.

Rosier was the daughter of the Martiniquais writer and painter Yva (née de Montaigne) and her husband, politician and mathematics instructor Thélus Léro.
She is perhaps best known for her role as the pianist Valerie in Jean-Pierre Melville's Le Samouraï (1967).

She also released her own musical album, entitled Cathy Banana.

References

External links
 

1945 births
2004 deaths
People from Fort-de-France
French film actresses
French television actresses
20th-century French actresses
French female models
Burials at Père Lachaise Cemetery
Martiniquais actresses